Lady Stair's House is a building, completed in 1892, which stands in Lady Stair's Close in Lawnmarket, Edinburgh, Scotland. The structure is a Category A listed building, having received its designation in 1970. Today it is home to the Writers' Museum.

The current building is a faux-medieval work by Stewart Henbest Capper dating from 1892. It was presented by the Earl of Roseberry (who probably commissioned the work) to the city for use as a museum in 1907. Only then did it acquire the name of "Lady Stair's House". It incorporates replicas of various carved stones probably from the earlier building. The house it replaced was demolished in 1890.

Lady Stair's House (3 Lady Stair's Close, 477 Lawnmarket) is located within Lady Stair's Close, just off the Lawnmarket. The original house was built in 1622 for Sir William Gray of Pittendrum. The lintel over the entrance is dated 1622 and carries the initials WG and GS, for William Gray and Geida (or Egidia) Smith, his wife (sister of Provost John Smith of Grothill), and the inscription "FEARE THE LORD AND DEPART FROM EVILL". Their son was the Scots Worthy Andrew Gray whose books became well-known despite dying at an early age. The building was initially known as Lady Gray's House and the close known as Lady Gray's Close.

The tenement is now named after the Gray's granddaughter: the society beauty Lady Stair, Elizabeth, Dowager Countess of Stair (née Elizabeth Dundas), the widow of John Dalrymple, 1st Earl of Stair. She purchased the building in 1719.

In the 1890s, the original building was inherited by Archibald Primrose, 5th Earl of Rosebery. The rebuilding of 1892 includes nothing of the original building other than unseen basement areas. In 1907, the Earl gave the house to the royal burgh of Edinburgh, for use as a municipal museum.

Lady Stair's House is designated a Category A listed building by Historic Environment Scotland.

See also
 List of listed buildings in Edinburgh

References

Category A listed buildings in Edinburgh
Royal Mile
1622 establishments in Scotland
Buildings and structures completed in 1622
Listed houses in Scotland